Carlos Lélis (31 October 1931 – 2 November 2021) was a Portuguese politician who served as a MP, representing the Social Democratic Party. He represented the constituency of Madeira and was at one time responsible for the department of education.

References

1931 births
2021 deaths
Portuguese politicians
Members of the Assembly of the Republic (Portugal)
Social Democratic Party (Portugal) politicians
People from Madeira